A precapillary sphincter is a band of contractile mural cells either classified as smooth muscle or pericytes that adjusts blood flow into capillaries. They were originally described in the mesenteric microcirculation, and were thought to only reside there. At the point where each of the capillaries originates from an arteriole, contractile mural cells encircle the capillary. This is called the precapillary sphincter. The precapillary sphincter has now also been found in the brain, where it regulates blood flow to the capillary bed. The sphincter can open and close the entrance to the capillary, by which contraction causes blood flow in a capillary to change as vasomotion occurs.  In some tissues, the entire capillary bed may be bypassed by blood flow through arteriovenous anastomoses or through preferential flow through metarterioles.  If the sphincter is damaged or cannot contract, blood can flow into the capillary bed at high pressures. When capillary pressures are high (as per gravity, etc.), fluid passes out of the capillaries into the interstitial space, and edema or fluid swelling is the result.

Dispute over concept
Precapillary sphincters and metarterioles were discovered in the mesenteric circulation in the 1950s. Medical and physiological textbooks, such as Guyton, Boron and Fulton, etc. were quick to claim the existence of said sphincters and metarterioles all over the body, despite lack of evidence. At least since 1976 there has been considerable debate about the existence of precapillary sphincters and metarterioles. In 2020, precapillary sphincters were identified as a mechanism for controlling cerebral blood flow.

References

Further reading 

 

Angiology
Circulatory system